Kenneth Langford is a retired British slalom canoeist who competed from the mid-1960s to the mid-1970s. He won a silver medal in the K-1 team event at the 1969 ICF Canoe Slalom World Championships in Bourg St.-Maurice.

References

External links 
 Kenneth LANGFORD at CanoeSlalom.net

Living people
Year of birth missing (living people)
British male canoeists
Medalists at the ICF Canoe Slalom World Championships